Brownsboro is an unincorporated community in Jackson County, Oregon, United States, on Oregon Route 140 about  east of Eagle Point.

The community, along Little Butte Creek, was named in 1853 for Henry R. Brown, who owned the land at this location. A post office called Brownsborough opened here in 1873. John Bilger was the first postmaster. The  post office name was changed to Brownsboro in 1892, and the office remained open until 1954.

References

Unincorporated communities in Jackson County, Oregon
Unincorporated communities in Oregon